Irakli Kvekveskiri (born 12 March 1990) is a Georgian football player who plays for Russian club Fakel Voronezh.

Club career
On 10 June 2022, Kvekveskiri signed with Fakel Voronezh.

Career statistics

Club

References

External links
Profile at HLSZ

1990 births
People from Ochamchira District
Georgian people of Russian descent
Living people

Footballers from Georgia (country)
Georgia (country) youth international footballers
Georgia (country) under-21 international footballers
Association football midfielders
FC Kuban Krasnodar players
Pécsi MFC players
Szigetszentmiklósi TK footballers
FC Dinamo Batumi players
FC Mika players
FC Guria Lanchkhuti players
FC Alashkert players
FC Ararat Moscow players
FC SKA-Khabarovsk players
FC Fakel Voronezh players
Nemzeti Bajnokság II players
Nemzeti Bajnokság I players
Erovnuli Liga players
Armenian Premier League players
Russian Second League players
Russian First League players
Russian Premier League players
Expatriate footballers from Georgia (country)
Expatriate footballers in Russia
Expatriate sportspeople from Georgia (country) in Russia
Expatriate footballers in Hungary
Expatriate sportspeople from Georgia (country) in Hungary
Expatriate footballers in Armenia
Expatriate sportspeople from Georgia (country) in Armenia